Alexander Stephens Clay (September 25, 1853November 13, 1910) was a United States senator from Georgia.

Biography
Clay was born in Powder Springs, Georgia, and graduated from Hiwassee College in Tennessee in 1875. He was admitted to the bar in 1877 and commenced practice in Marietta, Georgia. He served on the Marietta city council in 1880 and 1881.

Clay was a member of the Georgia House of Representatives from 1884-1887 and 1889-1890, and served as speaker pro tempore in 1886-1887 and 1889-1890. He was a member of the Georgia Senate from 1892-1894 and served as its president for his last two years in that body. In 1896 Clay was elected to the U.S. Senate and reelected twice (in 1902 and 1908). As a U.S. senator, Clay served as chair of the Committee on Revolutionary Claims and as a member of the Committee on Woman Suffrage.

Clay died in Atlanta while in office in 1910 and was buried in the City Cemetery in Marietta.  Joseph M. Terrell was appointed to fulfill the remainder of Clay's term.

Family relationships 
One son was General Lucius D. Clay, and another son was Eugene Herbert Clay.

Two grandsons were General Lucius D. Clay Jr. and Major General Frank Butner Clay.

See also
List of United States Congress members who died in office (1900–49)

References

External links
 
 Alexander S. Clay, late a senator from Georgia, Memorial addresses delivered in the House of Representatives and Senate frontispiece 1911
 Photograph of the Liberty ship Alexander S. Clay under construction (second view), J.A. Jones Construction Company shipyard, Brunswick, Georgia, 1944 May 23

1853 births
1910 deaths
People from Powder Springs, Georgia
Democratic Party members of the Georgia House of Representatives
Democratic Party Georgia (U.S. state) state senators
Democratic Party United States senators from Georgia (U.S. state)
Georgia (U.S. state) lawyers
19th-century American politicians
State political party chairs of Georgia (U.S. state)
19th-century American lawyers